The tenth season of NCIS an American police procedural drama series originally aired on CBS from September 25, 2012, through May 14, 2013. The season was produced by Belisarius Productions and CBS Television Studios.

Cast and characters

Main
 Mark Harmon as Leroy Jethro Gibbs, NCIS Supervisory Special Agent (SSA) of the Major Case Response Team (MCRT) assigned to Washington's Navy Yard
 Michael Weatherly as Anthony DiNozzo, NCIS Senior Special Agent, second in command of MCRT
 Cote de Pablo as Ziva David, NCIS Special Agent
 Pauley Perrette as Abby Sciuto, Forensic Specialist for NCIS
 Sean Murray as Timothy McGee, NCIS Special Agent
 Brian Dietzen as Jimmy Palmer, Assistant Medical Examiner for NCIS
 Rocky Carroll as Leon Vance, NCIS Director
 David McCallum as Dr. Donald "Ducky" Mallard, Chief Medical Examiner for NCIS

Recurring
 Alan Dale as Thomas Morrow, Homeland Security Section Chief and former NCIS Director
 Joe Spano as Tobias Fornell, FBI Senior Special Agent
 Joel Gretsch as Stan Burley, NCIS Special Agent Afloat on the USS Borealis and former member of Gibbs' team
 Michael Nouri as Eli David, Mossad Director and Ziva's father
 Ralph Waite as Jackson Gibbs, Gibbs' father
 Paula Newsome as Jackie Vance, Leon Vance's wife
 Robert Wagner as Anthony DiNozzo, Sr., Tony's father
 Diane Neal as Abigail Borin, CGIS Special Agent in Charge
 Matt Craven as Clayton Jarvis, Secretary of the Navy
 Akinsola Aribo as Jared Vance, Leon Vance's son
 Kiara Muhammad as Kayla Vance, Leon Vance's daughter
 Daniel Louis Rivas as Kyle Davis, Abby's brother
 Melinda McGraw as Diane Sterling, Gibbs' and Fornell's ex-wife
 Matt L. Jones as Ned Dorneget, NCIS Special Agent
 Richard Schiff as Harper Dearing, NCIS target
 Ben Morrison as young Eli David, Mossad Director and Ziva's father
 Gabi Coccio as young Ziva David
 Greg Germann as Jerome Craig, NCIS Assistant Director
 Oded Fehr as Ilan Bodnar, NCIS target
 Marina Sirtis as Orli Elbaz, new Mossad Director
 Damon Dayoub as Adam Eshel, Ziva's contact
 Colin Hanks as Richard Parsons, DoD Inspector

Guests
 Muse Watson as Mike Franks, deceased retired Senior Special Agent for NCIS and Gibbs' former boss
 John M. Jackson as A. J. Chegwidden, lawyer, and former Judge Advocate General
 Jamey Sheridan as Admiral John McGee, McGee's father

Episodes

Production

Development
NCIS was renewed for a tenth season on March 14, 2012. NCIS was renewed for an eleventh season on February 1, 2013.

Casting
In June 2012, Entertainment Weekly reported that Brian Dietzen had been promoted to a series regular for this season. John M. Jackson will reprise his role as A.J. Chegwidden in the season finale of NCIS.

Broadcast
Season ten of NCIS premiered on September 25, 2012.

Reception
On January 15, 2013, the episode "Shiva" delivered the biggest audience ever so far for an NCIS episode. 22.86 million people watched the episode, which surpassed the season eight episode "Freedom" by 10,000 viewers.

Season ten of NCIS also got to deliver its first place ratings achievement for the 2012–13 United States network television season. NCIS beat out NBC's Sunday Night Football to become the overall most watched program nationally.

Ratings

References

General references

External links

 
 

2012 American television seasons
2013 American television seasons
NCIS 10